Smiths Hill Fort was a fort at North Wollongong, New South Wales, Australia. The fort was also known as Wollongong Fort.

History
Built between 1891-1893 to provide a deterrent to a possible Russian attack upon Wollongong Harbour.

The fort is a concealed battery on high ground above Wollongong Harbour with underground rooms for supplies, ammunition and shelter with emplacements for two 80-pound cannons on iron carriages, and a 1 1/2 inch quick firing gun.

It was used extensively for company training and maintained by the Wollongong-Bulli Half Company.

In 1946, the fort was filled with rubble and dirt. The fort was dug out and restored in 1988 and two cannons were restored and reinstalled at the fort.

Armaments
 2 x RML 80 pound guns
 1 x 1 1/2 inch Nordenfelt quick firing gun

See also

 Military history of Australia

References
 NSW Heritage Listing
 Illawarra Historical Society
 Wollongong Harbour History Walk image
 Royal Australian Artillery Historical Company gun registers on the Nordenfelt quick firing gun and RML 80 Pound gun

External links
 
 Smith's Hill Fort - official site

Batteries in Australia
Buildings and structures in Wollongong
Bunkers in Oceania
Forts in New South Wales
History of Wollongong
Tourist attractions in Wollongong
North Wollongong, New South Wales